Al-Sultan Ali Kalaminja Siri Dhammaru Naaja Mahaa Radun (Dhivehi: އައްސުލްޠާން ޢަލީ ކަލަމިންޖާ އެއްވަނަ ސިރީ ދަންމަރުނާޖަ މަހާރަދުން) was the Sultan of the Maldives from 1185 to 1193. He was the son of Rekehiriyaa Maavaa Kilege (Dhivehi: ރެކެހިރިޔާ މާވާކިލެގެ). Sultan Ali I was succeeded by Dhinei

12th-century sultans of the Maldives